Teddy Boy is a subculture.

Teddy Boy may also refer to:
 Teddy Boy (EP), an electro house recording Kavinsky
 "Teddy Boy" (song), a rock song by Paul McCartney
 Teddy boy cut, a hairstyle
 Teddy Boy, a manhua series best known in film adapted form as the Young and Dangerous franchise
 Teddy Boy Blues, a video game by Sega.
 "Teddy Boys", a song recorded by Kelly Willis